João Manuel may refer to:

 João Manuel (bishop of Guarda) (1416–1476)
 João Manuel, Prince of Portugal (1537–1554)
 João Manuel (footballer, born 1967) (1967-2005), Portuguese footballer
 João Manuel (footballer, born 1994), Portuguese footballer